Thermoflavimicrobium is a Gram-positive, thermophilic, aerobic and chemoorganotroph bacterial genus from the family of Thermoactinomycetaceae. Up to now there is only one species of this genus known (Thermoflavimicrobium dichotomicum).

References

Bacillales
Bacteria genera
Monotypic bacteria genera
Thermophiles